El Castillo de las Guardas is a city located in the province of Seville, Spain. According to the 2005 census (INE), the city has a population of 1619 inhabitants.

References

External links
 El Castillo de las Guardas - Sistema de Información Multiterritorial de Andalucía

Municipalities of the Province of Seville